Arable land (from the , "able to be ploughed") is any land capable of being ploughed and used to grow crops. Alternatively, for the purposes of agricultural statistics, the term often has a more precise definition: 

A more concise definition appearing in the Eurostat glossary similarly refers to actual rather than potential uses: "land worked (ploughed or tilled) regularly, generally under a system of crop rotation".In Britain, arable land has traditionally been contrasted with pasturable land such as heaths, which could be used for sheep-rearing but not as farmland.

Arable land is vulnerable to land degradation and some types of un-arable land can be enriched to create useful land.  Climate change and biodiversity loss, are driving pressure on arable land.

By country

According to the Food and Agriculture Organization of the United Nations, in 2013, the world's arable land amounted to 1.407 billion hectares, out of a total of 4.924 billion hectares of land used for agriculture.

Arable land (hectares per person)

Non-arable land

Agricultural land that is not arable according to the FAO definition above includes:
 Meadows and pasturesland used as pasture and grazed range, and those natural grasslands and sedge meadows that are used for hay production in some regions.
 Permanent cropland that produces crops from woody vegetation, e.g. orchard land, vineyards, coffee plantations, rubber plantations, and land producing nut trees;

Other non-arable land includes land that is not suitable for any agricultural use. Land that is not arable, in the sense of lacking capability or suitability for cultivation for crop production, has one or more limitationsa lack of sufficient freshwater for irrigation, stoniness, steepness, adverse climate, excessive wetness with the impracticality of drainage, excessive salts, or a combination of these, among others. Although such limitations may preclude cultivation, and some will in some cases preclude any agricultural use, large areas unsuitable for cultivation may still be agriculturally productive. For example, United States NRCS statistics indicate that about 59 percent of US non-federal pasture and unforested rangeland is unsuitable for cultivation, yet such land has value for grazing of livestock. In British Columbia, Canada, 41 percent of the provincial Agricultural Land Reserve area is unsuitable for the production of cultivated crops, but is suitable for uncultivated production of forage usable by grazing livestock. Similar examples can be found in many rangeland areas elsewhere.

Changes in arability

Land conversion 
Land incapable of being cultivated for the production of crops can sometimes be converted to arable land. New arable land makes more food and can reduce starvation. This outcome also makes a country more self-sufficient and politically independent, because food importation is reduced. Making non-arable land arable often involves digging new irrigation canals and new wells, aqueducts, desalination plants, planting trees for shade in the desert, hydroponics, fertilizer, nitrogen fertilizer, pesticides, reverse osmosis water processors, PET film insulation or other insulation against heat and cold, digging ditches and hills for protection against the wind, and installing greenhouses with internal light and heat for protection against the cold outside and to provide light in cloudy areas. Such modifications are often prohibitively expensive. An alternative is the seawater greenhouse, which desalinates water through evaporation and condensation using solar energy as the only energy input. This technology is optimized to grow crops on desert land close to the sea.

The use of artifices does not make the land arable. Rock still remains rock, and shallowless than turnable soil is still not considered toilable. The use of artifice is an open-air none recycled water hydroponics relationship. The below described circumstances are not in perspective, have limited duration, and have a tendency to accumulate trace materials in soil that either there or elsewhere cause deoxygenation. The use of vast amounts of fertilizer may have unintended consequences for the environment by devastating rivers, waterways, and river endings through the accumulation of non-degradable toxins and nitrogen-bearing molecules that remove oxygen and cause non-aerobic processes to form.

Examples of infertile non-arable land being turned into fertile arable land include:
 Aran Islands: These islands off the west coast of Ireland (not to be confused with the Isle of Arran in Scotland's Firth of Clyde) were unsuitable for arable farming because they were too rocky. The people covered the islands with a shallow layer of seaweed and sand from the ocean. Today, crops are grown there, even though the islands are still considered non-arable.
 Israel: The construction of desalination plants along Israel's coast allowed agriculture in some areas that were formerly desert. The desalination plants, which remove the salt from ocean water, have produced a new source of water for farming, drinking, and washing.
 Slash and burn agriculture uses nutrients in wood ash, but these expire within a few years.
 Terra preta, fertile tropical soils produced by adding charcoal.

Land degradation

Examples 
Examples of fertile arable land being turned into infertile land include:
 Droughts such as the "Dust Bowl" of the Great Depression in the US turned farmland into desert.
 Each year, arable land is lost due to desertification and human-induced erosion. Improper irrigation of farmland can wick the sodium, calcium, and magnesium from the soil and water to the surface. This process steadily concentrates salt in the root zone, decreasing productivity for crops that are not salt-tolerant.
 Rainforest deforestation: The fertile tropical forests are converted into infertile desert land. For example, Madagascar's central highland plateau has become virtually totally barren (about ten percent of the country) as a result of slash-and-burn deforestation, an element of shifting cultivation practiced by many natives.

See also
 Development easement
 Land use statistics by country
 List of environment topics
 Soil fertility

References

External links

 Article from Technorati on Shrinking Arable Farmland in the world
 Surface area of the Earth

Agricultural land